Market Street is a street in the city centre of Sydney in New South Wales, Australia. It runs from Sussex Street near Darling Harbour in the west, to Elizabeth Street at St. James railway station in the east.

Market Street is located in the heart of the Sydney central business district shopping precinct. The street gets its name due to the street being located at the CBD’s shopping precinct.  The two flagship David Jones department stores in Sydney are located in Market Street, diagonally across the Castlereagh Street intersection. Market Street provides the southern border of Pitt Street Mall and features such shopping centres as Centrepoint, the Queen Victoria Building and Sydney Central Plaza (which includes the Sydney flagship Myer department store). The State Theatre is located between Pitt and George Street intersections.

A footbridge at the end of Market street provides a direct link to Pyrmont Bridge and Darling Harbour. All traffic travels one way along Market Street, from east to west. A flyover is located at the end Market Street which links traffic to the Western Distributor and then Ultimo, Pyrmont, the Anzac Bridge and beyond.

Market Street is where prominent cricketer Victor Trumper owned a sporting goods store. It was at this store in a series of meetings between Trumper, J J Giltinan and others, that the creation of the New South Wales Rugby Football League was conceived.

See also

References

 
Streets in Sydney